The Fighting Democratic Movement (Greek: Αγωνιστικό Δημοκρατικό Κίνημα, ADIK) was a conservative and centrist political party in Cyprus. 
At the 2001 legislative elections, 27 May 2001, the party won 2.2% of the popular vote and 1 out of 56 seats. In 2006 it lost parliamentary representation. In 2011, ADIK decided to become part of the centre party DIKO.

External links 
 Official website

Political parties in Cyprus